Al-Rawda is a tell, or archaeological settlement mound, in the Syrian steppe, east of Hama. It was a large urban site with city walls and several temples, occupied between 2400–2000 BC. A French–Syrian mission has been excavating the site since 2002.

History of research
Al-Rawda was discovered in 1996 during an archaeological survey of the region east of Hama. Following this survey, a more intensive survey project was initiated focusing on a microregion of  centred on Al-Rawda. Excavations at the site itself started in 2002 and are carried out by a French–Syrian mission. The excavations have focused on the circular walls, the northern gate of the town, the temple and the nearby necropolis. In addition to the excavations, a magnetometric prospection, a method that allows the detection of walls in the ground without excavating them, was carried out in the area within the city walls in 2003. Work continued at least through 2006. The Al-Rawda project is sponsored by the French National Centre for Scientific Research (CNRS) and the Syrian Directorate-General of Antiquities and Museums and co-directed by Corinne Castel and Nazir Awad.

The site and its environment
The survey of the microregion around Al-Rawda revealed that the site is located in a fayda, a depression that collects runoff water from a wide region, and next to a wadi. Al-Rawda was surrounded by hydrological installations intended to harness runoff water for irrigation. The southwestern part of the site is occupied by modern houses.

Occupation history
The site was occupied for a relatively short period during the late third and early second millennium BC, roughly coinciding with the Early Bronze IV period. It was founded around 2400 BC and finally abandoned in circa 2000 BC. The magnetometric survey revealed a circular street pattern with streets radiating away from the centre of the site. Both the temple and the circular street pattern find parallels in Tell Chuera, located in a similar environment to the northeast of Al-Rawda. At least three temples were identified, of which one has been excavated. Offerings that were found in this temple include alabaster from Egypt, lapis lazuli from Afghanistan and agate from India. The city was defended by a double rampart built of mudbricks on a stone foundation and two ditches. The town was accessible through five gates.

The urban site indicates that it was a part of several trade networks of different scales. Al-Rawda probably served as a stopping place for caravans that crossed the plateau between the Euphrates valley and the region of Qatna. The site also served as a religious center for the region, with a large sanctuary that was likely dedicated to the city's patron god, and it played a major part in the development of extensive pastoralism and wool production at the end of the third millennium BC.

The necropolis
The necropolis is situated close to the site but outside the agricultural zone. Among the 97 tombs found, 54 were shaft tombs –intended for multiple burials and cut into the limestone crust of the plateau, 25 were simple cist tombs and 17 were circle tombs.

References

Further reading
Castel, Corinne. "Monumental Architecture at the Margins of the Syrian Desert: Spatial Analysis, Functions and Rituals of the Sanctuary of Tell Al-Rawda (Early Bronze Age IV)." ICAANE Proceedings of the 12th International Congress on the Archaeology of the Ancient Near East, held in Bologne. Vol. 12. Harrassowitz Verlag, 2021.

 Corinne Castel. The First Temples in antis : The Sanctuary of Tell Al-Rawda in the Context of 3rd millennium Syria. Becker J.; Hempelmann R.; Rehm E. Kulturlandschaft Syrien, Zentrum und Peripherie, Festschrift für Jan-Waalke Meyer, Ugarit Verlag, pp. 123-164, 2010

See also
Cities of the ancient Near East

Bronze Age sites in Syria
Former populated places in Syria
Rawda